Mom's Outta Sight is a 1998 American film, starring Hannes Jaenicke, Mary Elizabeth McGlynn and Harrison Myers. It was directed by Fred Olen Ray and written by Sean O'Bannon.

Plot
Prof. John Richards designs a contraption which can move objects instantly from one place to another. As the new machine seems like a new success it attracts the attention of Richards' assistant Martin, who wants to steal the new invention and sell it himself.

Cast
 Hannes Jaenicke as Dr. John Richards
 Mary Elizabeth McGlynn as Barbara Richards
 Harrison Myers as Jackie Richards

External links
 
 

1998 films
1998 comedy films
Films directed by Fred Olen Ray
1990s English-language films
American science fiction comedy films
1990s American films